Joseph-Elzéar Bernier (January 1, 1852 – December 26, 1934) was a Canadian mariner from Quebec who led expeditions into the Canadian Arctic in the early 20th century.
 
He was born in L'Islet, Quebec, the son of Captain Thomas Bernier and Célinas Paradis. At the age of 14, he became a cabin boy on his father's ship. Three years later, he became captain of his own ship and commanded sailing ships for the next 25 years. Bernier was named governor for the jail at Quebec City in 1895. From 1904 to 1911, he explored the Arctic archipelago on annual voyages in his ship the CGS Arctic and officially claimed the islands for Canada. Bernier retrieved documents that had been stored in caches by earlier Arctic explorers. He also established Royal Canadian Mounted Police posts in the Canadian north. During World War I, Bernier commanded a ship which transported mail along the eastern coast and carried goods in convoys across the Atlantic. He returned to patrolling the arctic after the war's end, continuing until his retirement in 1925, when he was awarded the Royal Geographical Society's Back Award.

Historian and expert on Northern Sovereignty Michael Byers noted that Bernier placed a plaque on Melville Island, in 1909, claiming Canadian Sovereignty over not only the entire Arctic Archipelago, but a wedge of the Arctic Ocean "from longitude 60°W to 141°W up to latitude 90°N," ie, all the way to the North Pole.  Byer characterized this claim as an articulation of sector theory, and noted how diplomats had widely rejected Russia's claims to a wedge of the Arctic, extending to the North Pole.

Bernier died of a heart attack in Lévis at the age of 82.

He published Master Mariner and Explorer: A Narrative of Sixty Years at Sea ... in 1939.

Joseph Idlout's daughter, Leah Idlout, has said that her father was the son of Bernier. It is thought that Idlout may have been the only son of Bernier.

Joseph-Elzéar Bernier and his Northern expeditions are featured on pages 12 & 13 of the 36 page Canadian Passport.

Archives
There is a Joseph-Elzéar Bernier fonds at Library and Archives Canada. Archival reference number is R7896.

References 
 Joseph Bernier, the Arctic Islands for Canada, Pathfinders and Passageways: The Exploration of Canada, Library and Archives Canada
 Joseph Elzéar Bernier (1852-1934), Arctic profiles, University of Calgary (pdf)

External links 
 Entry from the Canadian Encyclopedia
 Exploring Polar Frontiers: A Historical Encyclopedia (2003) Mills, William James 
 BERNIER'S ARCHIPELAGO. Arctic explorer from whom the Tories draw inspiration for their 'use it or lose it' motto to be feted on Canada Day

1852 births
1934 deaths
Canadian explorers
Persons of National Historic Significance (Canada)
Royal Canadian Geographical Society fellows